Corrado Barazzutti was the defending champion but did not compete that year.

Robert Lutz won in the final 6–2, 6–2, 7–6 against Tom Gullikson.

Seeds
A champion seed is indicated in bold text while text in italics indicates the round in which that seed was eliminated.

  Brian Gottfried (semifinals)
  John Lloyd (first round)
  Stan Smith (first round)
  Robert Lutz (champion)
  Ulrich Pinner (quarterfinals)
  Tom Gullikson (final)
  Ángel Giménez (second round)
  Mark Cox (semifinals)

Draw

 NB: The Final was the best of 5 sets while all other rounds were the best of 3 sets.

Final

Section 1

Section 2

External links
 1978 Paris Open draw

Singles